NGC 2261 (also known as Hubble's Variable Nebula or Caldwell 46) is a variable nebula located in the constellation Monoceros. The nebula is illuminated by the star R Monocerotis (R Mon), which is not directly visible itself.

Observing history
The first recorded observation of the nebula was by William Herschel on 26 December 1783, being described as considerably bright and 'fan-shaped'. It had long been designated as H IV 2, after being the second entry of Herschel's class 4 category for nebulae and star clusters, in his catalogues of nebulae.

NGC 2261 was imaged as Palomar Observatory's Hale Telescope's first light by Edwin Hubble on January 26, 1949, some 20 years after the Palomar Observatory project began in 1928. Hubble had studied the nebula previously at Yerkes and Mt. Wilson. Hale had taken photographic plates with a 24-inch (60.96 cm) reflecting telescope in 1916. Also, plates were taken using the same telescope in 1908 by FC Jordan, allowing Hale to use of a blink comparator to study any changes in the nebula.

NGC 2261 was imaged by the Hubble Space Telescope, and an image of the nebula was released in 1999.

A timelapse of NGC 2261 was provided showing a period of 6 months, from October 2021-April 2022. This was shot by over 20 astronomers at the Big Amateur Telescope. In August of 2022 the project was resumed as NGC 2261 came out from behind the sun.

Descriptions
The star R Monocerotis has lit up a nearby cloud of gas and dust, but the shape and brightness slowly changes visibly even in small telescopes over weeks and months, and the nebula looks like a small comet.

One explanation proposed for the variability is that dense clouds of dust near R Mon periodically block the illumination from the star. This casts a temporary shadow on the nearby clouds.

See also
NGC 1555
New General Catalogue

References

External links

 European Homepage for the HST – Hubble photos and information on NGC 2261
 wikispaces.com  – Images by amateur astronomers
 Astrobiscuit: Seeing The Speed Of Light fun and educational video about variable nebula and the amateur community observing them

 

2261
Monoceros (constellation)
046b
Reflection nebulae
Astronomical objects discovered in 1949
•